The Port of Alicante is a seaport in Alicante, Spain on the Mediterranean Sea used for commercial and passenger traffic. The port is administered by the Port Authority of Alicante.

References

External links
 Official website 
 Puertos del Estado 

Alicante
Alicante